Dorothea of Denmark (1528 – 11 November 1575), was a Danish princess and a Duchess consort of Mecklenburg. She was the daughter of king Frederick I of Denmark and Sophie of Pomerania. She was married to Christopher, Duke of Mecklenburg-Gadebusch in 1573.

Dorothea was raised with her maternal grand parents in Pomerania as a child, but spent her adult life at the Danish royal court and with her mother in Kiel. She took part in the entourage of her niece Anne of Denmark at the latter's wedding in Saxony in 1548, but otherwise she lived a discreet life. She died two years after her marriage, and her sister Elizabeth of Denmark had a monument erected over her grave.

Ancestry

References 
 Dansk biografisk Lexikon / IV. Bind. Clemens - Eynden  (in Danish)

Danish princesses
1575 deaths
1528 births
Daughters of kings